Nightingale is an English surname, originally a nickname for someone with a good voice. Notable people with this surname include the following:

  The Nightingale Baronetcy, an aristocratic title in the Baronetage of England, created in 1628
 Adam Nightingale (born 1979), American ice hockey coach
 Albert Nightingale (1923–2006), English footballer
 Andrea Nightingale (born 1959), American classical scholar
 Annie Nightingale (born 1940), British radio broadcaster
 Anthony Nightingale (born 1947), Hong Kong businessman
 Benedict Nightingale (born 1939), British journalist
 Danny Nightingale (born 1954),British modern pentathlete
 Danny Nightingale (soldier) (born 1975), British soldier
 David Nightingale, English footballer
 Deborah Nightingale, American industrial engineer
 Earl Nightingale (1921–1989), American motivational speaker
 Florence Nightingale (1820–1910), British pioneer of modern nursing and statistician
 Frances Parthenope Verney, nee Nightingale (1819–1890), British novelist, economist, social commentator, and journalist.
 Gardner Nightingale (1920-2013), American soldier and business founder
 James Nightingale (rugby league) (born 1986), Papua New Guinean rugby league player
 James Nightingale (English footballer)
 Jared Nightingale (born 1982), American ice hockey defenceman
 Jason Nightingale (born 1986), New Zealand rugby player
 John Nightingale (actor) (c.1943–1980), British actor
 John Nightingale (figure skater) (born 1928), American figure skater
 John Nightingale (MP) for Leicester (UK Parliament constituency)
 Joseph Nightingale (1775–1824), English writer and preacher
 Luke Nightingale (born 1980), English footballer
 Lynn Nightingale (born 1956), Canadian figure skater
 Mark Nightingale (born 1967), British jazz trombonist
 Mary Nightingale (born 1963), English newsreader and television presenter
 Maxine Nightingale (born 1952), British soul music singer
 Michael Nightingale (1922–1999), English actor
 Neil Nightingale, British naturalist and television producer
 Tunde Nightingale (Earnest Olatunde Thomas) (1922–1981), Nigerian singer and guitarist
 Wally Nightingale (1956–1996), English guitarist of the Sex Pistols
 Rabbi Tzvi Nightingale (born 1960) Canadian American Rabbi
 Will Nightingale (born 1995), English footballer
 William Nightingale (1794–1874), English Unitarian, the father of Florence Nightingale

References

English-language surnames